The Broad River is a tidal channel in Beaufort and Jasper counties, South Carolina. The channel flows between the mainland on the west and Port Royal and Parris islands on the east. The Coosawhatchie River flows into the Broad River at the head. It joins Coosaw River channel Northeast and continues Southeast to the Atlantic Ocean as Port Royal Sound.

S.C. Highway 170 crosses the Broad River on a 1.7-mile bridge, connecting Beaufort and Port Royal with southern Beaufort and Jasper counties.

References 

Rivers of South Carolina
Rivers of Beaufort County, South Carolina
Rivers of Jasper County, South Carolina